San Pedro Ocotlán is a town in the Mexican state of Zacatecas. It is one of the smaller settlements in the municipality of Tepechitlán.

In the INEGI 2005 census, it reported a population of 796.

References
Tepechitlán (Zacatecas state government)

Populated places in Zacatecas